Edgehills Quarry is a  geological Site of Special Scientific Interest in Gloucestershire, notified in 1974.

The site is listed in the 'Forest of Dean Local Plan Review' as a Key Wildlife Site (KWS).

Location and geology
The quarry is sited in the Forest of Dean and provides an easily accessible exposure through c.75 metres of Drybrook Sandstone. The sandstones include good sedimentary structures and fossil traces which indicate a shallow marine environment.  The Drybrook Sandstone lies between the Chadian Whitehead Limestone and the overlying unconformable Coal
Measures.

The Quarry is near other similar sites and nature reserves being Merring Meend, Westbury Brook Pond, Fairplay Iron Mine and Plump Hill Dolomite Quarry.

References

SSSI Source
 Natural England SSSI information on the citation
 Natural England SSSI information on the Edgehills Quarry unit

External links
 Natural England (SSSI information)

Sites of Special Scientific Interest in Gloucestershire
Sites of Special Scientific Interest notified in 1974
Forest of Dean
Quarries in Gloucestershire